Fissidens arnoldii is a species of moss belonging to the family Fissidentaceae.

It is native to Southern Europe.

References

Dicranales